Asangi  is a village in the southern state of Karnataka, India. It is located in the Jamkhandi taluk of Bagalkot district in Karnataka. They speak different languages: Kannada, Marathi, Urdu. It is 774 feet above sea level. The minuscule village belongs to the Mysore Division. The literacy rate of the village is 74.6%.

Demographics
 India census, Asangi had a population of 5787 with 2953 males and 2834 females.

See also
 Bagalkot
 Districts of Karnataka

References

External links
 http://Bagalkot.nic.in/

Villages in Bagalkot district